The Cruel Sea (translit. Bas Ya Bahar) is a 1972 Kuwaiti drama film directed by . It was the first Kuwaiti film to be produced. The film was selected as the Kuwaiti entry for the Best Foreign Language Film at the 45th Academy Awards, but was not accepted as a nominee.

Cast
 Mohammed Al-Mansour as Moussaed
 Amal Bakr as Nura
 Saad Al-Faraj as Father
 Hayat El-Fahad as Mother

See also
 Cinema of Kuwait
 List of submissions to the 45th Academy Awards for Best Foreign Language Film
 List of Kuwaiti submissions for the Academy Award for Best Foreign Language Film

References

External links
 

1972 films
Kuwaiti drama films
1972 drama films
1970s Arabic-language films
Kuwaiti black-and-white films